Heteronormativity is the concept that heterosexuality is the preferred or normal mode of sexual orientation. It assumes the gender binary (i.e., that there are only two distinct, opposite genders) and that sexual and marital relations are most fitting between people of opposite sex. A heteronormative view, therefore, involves alignment of biological sex, sexuality, gender identity and gender roles. Heteronormativity is often linked to heterosexism and homophobia. The effects of societal heteronormativity on lesbian, gay and bisexual individuals can be examined as heterosexual or "straight" privilege.

Etymology
Michael Warner popularized the term in 1991, in one of the first major works of queer theory. The concept's roots are in Gayle Rubin's notion of the "sex/gender system" and Adrienne Rich's notion of compulsory heterosexuality. From the outset, theories of heteronormativity included a critical look at gender; Warner wrote that "every person who comes to a queer self-understanding knows in one way or another that her stigmatization is intricated with gender. ... Being queer ... means being able, more or less articulately, to challenge the common understanding of what gender difference means." Lauren Berlant and Warner further developed these ideas in their seminal essay, "Sex in Public."

Discrimination
Critics of heteronormative attitudes, such as Cathy J. Cohen, Michael Warner, and Lauren Berlant, argue that such attitudes are oppressive, stigmatizing, marginalizing of perceived deviant forms of sexuality and gender, and make self-expression more challenging when that expression does not conform to the norm. Heteronormativity describes how social institutions and policies reinforce the presumption that people are heterosexual and that gender and sex are natural binaries. Heteronormative culture privileges heterosexuality as normal and natural and fosters a climate where LGBT individuals are discriminated against in marriage, tax codes, and employment. Following Berlant and Warner, Laurie and Stark also argue that the domestic "intimate sphere" becomes "the unquestioned non‐place that anchors heteronormative public discourses, especially those concerning marriage and adoption rights".

Against gay, lesbian, bisexual, and transgender individuals
According to cultural anthropologist Gayle Rubin, heteronormativity in mainstream society creates a "sex hierarchy" that graduates sexual practices from morally "good sex" to "bad sex". The hierarchy considers reproductive, monogamous sex between committed heterosexuals as "good," whereas any sexual act or individual who falls short of this standard is labeled as "bad." Specifically, this standard categorizes long-term committed gay couples and non-monogamous/sexually active gay individuals between the two poles. Patrick McCreery, lecturer at New York University, argues that this hierarchy explains how gay people are stigmatized for socially "deviant" sexual practices that are often practiced by straight people as well, such as consumption of pornography or sex in public places. There are many studies of sexual orientation discrimination on college campuses.

McCreery states that this heteronormative hierarchy carries over to the workplace, where gay, lesbian, and bisexual individuals face discrimination such as anti-homosexual hiring policies or workplace discrimination that often leaves "lowest hierarchy" individuals such as transsexual people vulnerable to the most overt discrimination and unable to find work.

Applicants and current employees can be legally passed over or fired for being non-heterosexual or perceived as non-heterosexual in many countries. An example of this practice is found in the case of the chain restaurant Cracker Barrel, which garnered national attention in 1991 after they fired an employee for being openly lesbian, citing their policy that employees with "sexual preferences that fail to demonstrate normal heterosexual values were inconsistent with traditional American values." Workers such as the fired employee and effeminate male waiters (allegedly described as the true targets), were legally fired by work policies "transgressing" against "normal" heteronormative culture.

Mustafa Bilgehan Ozturk analyzes the interconnectivity of heteronormativity and sexual employment discrimination by tracing the impact of patriarchal practices and institutions on the workplace experiences of lesbian, gay, and bisexual employees in a variety of contexts in Turkey. This further demonstrates the specific historicity and localized power/knowledge formations that give rise to physical, professional, and psycho-emotive acts of prejudice against sexual minorities.

Certain religions have been known to promote heteronormative beliefs through their teachings. According to Sociology professors Samuel Perry and Kara Snawder from The University of Oklahoma, multiple research studies in the past have shown that there can be and often is a link between the religious beliefs of Americans and homophobic behavior. Out of the world's five major religions, the Abrahamic religions—Christianity, Judaism, and Islam—all uphold heteronormative views on marriage. Some examples of this playing out in recent years include the incident involving Kentucky clerk Kim Davis, who refused to give marriage licenses to same-sex couples on the grounds that it violated her spiritual views, as well as the Supreme Court ruling that a Colorado baker did not have to provide a wedding cake for a gay couple based on his religion.

Relation to marriage and the nuclear family
Modern family structures in the past and present vary from what was typical of the 1950s nuclear family. In the United States, the families of the second half of the 19th century and early 20th century were characterized by the death of one or both parents for many American children. In 1985, the United States is estimated to have been home to approximately 2.5 million post-divorce, stepfamily households containing children. During the late 80s, almost 20% of families with children headed by a married couple were stepfamilies.

Over the past three decades, rates of divorce, single parenting, and cohabitation have risen precipitously. Nontraditional families (which diverge from "a middle-class family with a bread-winning father and a stay-at-home mother, married to each other and raising their biological children") constitute the majority of families in the United States and Canada today. Shared Earning/Shared Parenting Marriage (also known as Peer Marriage) where two heterosexual parents are both providers of resources and nurturers to children has become popular. Modern families may also have single-parent headed families which can be caused by divorce, separation, death, families who have two parents who are not married but have children, or families with same-sex parents. With artificial insemination, surrogate mothers, and adoption, families do not have to be formed by the heteronormative biological union of a male and a female. 

The consequences of these changes for the adults and children involved are heavily debated. In a 2009 Massachusetts spousal benefits case, developmental psychologist Michael Lamb testified that parental sexual orientation does not negatively affect childhood development. "Since the end of the 1980s... it has been well established that children and adolescents can adjust just as well in nontraditional settings as in traditional settings," he argued.  However, columnist Maggie Gallagher argues that heteronormative social structures are beneficial to society because they are optimal for the raising of children.  Australian-Canadian ethicist Margaret Somerville argues that "giving same-sex couples the right to found a family unlinks parenthood from biology". Recent criticisms of this argument have been made by Timothy Laurie, who argues that both intersex conditions and infertility rates have always complicated links between biology, marriage, and child-rearing.

A subset of heteronormativity is the concept of heteronormative temporality. This ideology states that the ultimate life goal for society is heterosexual marriage. Societal factors pressure humans to engage in the roles of the traditional nuclear family structure, which include searching for a partner of the opposite sex, engaging in a heterosexual marriage, and having children. Heteronormative temporality promotes abstinence-only until marriage. Many American parents adhere to this heteronormative narrative and teach it to their children. According to Amy T. Schalet, it seems that the bulk of parent-child sex education revolves around abstinence-only practices in the United States, but this differs in other parts of the world. Similarly, George Washington University Professor, Abby Wilkerson, discusses how the healthcare and medicinal industries reinforce the views of heterosexual marriage to promote heteronormative temporality. The concept of heteronormative temporality extends beyond heterosexual marriage to include a pervasive system where heterosexuality is seen as a standard, and anything outside of that realm is not tolerated. Wilkerson explains that it dictates aspects of everyday life such as nutritional health, socio-economic status, personal beliefs, and traditional gender roles.

Transgressions

Intersex people

Intersex people have biological characteristics that are ambiguously either male or female. If such a condition is detected, intersex people in most present-day societies are almost always assigned a normative sex shortly after birth. Surgery (usually involving modification to the genitalia) is often performed in an attempt to produce an unambiguously male or female body, with the parents'—rather than the individual's—consent. The child is then usually raised and enculturated as a cisgender heterosexual member of the assigned sex, which may or may not match their emergent gender identity throughout life or some remaining sex characteristics (for example, chromosomes, genes or internal sex organs).

Transgender people
Transgender people experience a mismatch between their gender identity and their assigned sex. Transgender is also an umbrella term because, in addition to including trans men and trans women whose binary gender identity is the opposite of their assigned sex (and who are sometimes specifically termed transsexual if they desire medical assistance to transition), it may include genderqueer people (whose identities are not exclusively masculine or feminine, but may, for example, be bigender, pangender, genderfluid, or agender). Other definitions include third-gender people as transgender or conceptualize transgender people as a third gender, and infrequently the term is defined very broadly to include cross-dressers.

Some transgender people seek sex reassignment therapy, and may not behave according to the gender role imposed by society. Some societies consider transgender behavior a crime worthy of capital punishment, including Saudi Arabia and many other nations. In some cases, gay or lesbian people were forced to undergo sex change treatments to "fix" their sex or gender: in some European countries during the 20th century, and in South Africa in the 1970s and 1980s.

In some countries, including North American and European countries, certain forms of violence against transgender people may be tacitly endorsed when prosecutors and juries refuse to investigate, prosecute, or convict those who perform the murders and beatings. Other societies have considered transgender behavior as a psychiatric illness serious enough to justify institutionalization.

In medical communities with these restrictions, patients have the option of either suppressing transsexual behavior and conforming to the norms of their birth sex (which may be necessary to avoid social stigma or even violence) or by adhering strictly to the norms of their "new" sex in order to qualify for sex reassignment surgery and hormonal treatments. Attempts to achieve an ambiguous or "alternative" gender identity would not be supported or allowed. Sometimes sex reassignment surgery is a requirement for an official gender change, and often "male" and "female" are the only choices available, even for intersex and non-binary people. For governments which allow only heterosexual marriages, official gender changes can have implications for related rights and privileges, such as child custody, inheritance, and medical decision-making.

Homonormativity

Homonormativity is a term which can refer to the privileging of homosexuality or the assimilation of heteronormative ideals and constructs into LGBTQ culture and individual identity. Specifically, Catherine Connell states that homonormativity "emphasizes commonality with the norms of heterosexual culture, including marriage, monogamy, procreation, and productivity". The term is almost always used in its latter sense, and was used prominently by Lisa Duggan in 2003, although transgender studies scholar Susan Stryker, in her article "Transgender History, Homonormativity, and Disciplinary", noted that it was also used by transgender activists in the 1990s in reference to the imposition of gay/lesbian norms over the concerns of transgender people. Transgender people were not included in healthcare programs combating the AIDS epidemic, and were often excluded from gay/lesbian demonstrations in Washington, D.C. Homonormativity has also grown to include transnormativity, or "the pressure put on trans people to conform to traditional, oppositional sexist understandings of gender". In addition, homonormativity can be used today to cover or erase the radical politics of the queer community during the Gay Liberation Movement, by not only replacing these politics with more conservative goals like marriage equality and adoption rights, but also commercializing and mainstreaming queer subcultures.

According to Penny Griffin, Politics and International Relations lecturer at the University of New South Wales, homonormativity upholds neoliberalism rather than critiquing the enforcement of monogamy, procreation, and binary gender roles as inherently heterosexist and racist. In this sense, homonormativity is deeply intertwined with the expansion and  maintenance of the internationally structured and structuring capitalistic worldwide system. Duggan asserts that homonormativity fragments LGBT communities into hierarchies of worthiness, and that LGBT people that come the closest to mimicking heteronormative standards of gender identity are deemed most worthy of receiving rights. She also states that LGBT individuals at the bottom of this hierarchy (e.g. bisexual people, trans people, non-binary people, people of non-Western genders, intersex people, queers of color, queer sex workers) are seen as an impediment to this class of homonormative individuals receiving their rights. For example, one empirical study found that in the Netherlands, transgender people and other gender non-conforming LGBT people are often looked down upon within their communities for not acting "normal". Those who do assimilate often become invisible in society and experience constant fear and shame about the non-conformers within their communities. Stryker referenced theorist Jürgen Habermas and his view of the public sphere allowing for individuals to come together, as a group, to discuss diverse ideologies and by excluding the non-conforming LGBTQ community, society as a whole were undoubtedly excluding the gender-variant individuals from civic participation.

Media representation 
Five different studies have shown that gay characters appearing on TV decreases the prejudice among viewers. Cable and streaming services are beginning to include more characters who are lesbian, gay, bisexual and transgender than broadcast television. Cable and streaming services are lacking in diversity, according to a GLAAD report, with many of the LGBT characters being gay men (41% and 39% respectively). The total number of LGBT characters counted on cable was reported to be 31% up from 2015, and bisexual representations saw an almost twofold increase.

Intersex people are excluded almost completely from television, though about 1% of the population is intersex. News medias outline what it means to be male or female, which causes a gap for anyone who doesn't fall into those two categories. Newspapers have covered the topic of intersex athletes with the case of Caster Semenya, where news spread of sporting officials having to determine whether she was to be considered female or male.

Those who do not identify as either woman or man are gender non-binary, or gender non-conforming. States in the United States are increasingly legalizing this "third" gender on official government documents as the existence of this identity is continuously debated among individuals. The controversy has resulted in minimal representation in the media, but recent television shows that have featured non-binary individuals include Ru Paul's Drag Race (2009–) and The Fosters (2013–2018). Members of the LGBTQ community claim that representation in media of non-binary people has not expanded to the extent of gender-conforming trans people.

In 2018, only 8.8% of broadcast television has an LGBTQ person on the show. Media portrays heterosexuality as "normal" in today's society so we see less homosexuality on television because of this. There are many stereotypes that come with this, as it can be seen in advertising, newspapers, radio, and television.  For example, mainstream media promote the idea that gay men are more likely to be attracted to advertisements that sell expensive, flamboyant, and possibly feminine products because of their assumed attitudes and way of life. Homosexuals and heterosexuals are also differentiated in the movies as well. Homosexual characters are predominantly seen in movies with issues regarding sexuality and the character is presented as homosexual. Television shows are also another aspect of media where there are stereotypes and negatively represented homosexuals. For example, the TV show Modern Family has two gay characters that are married and have a small adopted child together. Some may see this relationship as degrading and stereotypical of how the mainstream media views homosexuals. The show's sexual politics are considered fake  because of how their relationship is portrayed as overly colorful and excessively put together. 

More LGBT content was produced in the media in 2018. According to GLAAD'S Annual Where We Are on TV Report, which records LGBTQ+ representation on television, the number of queer characters on TV shows rose 8.8%. Queer people of color also saw an increase in screen time; they outnumbered white queer people on television for the first time in the report's history.

See also

 Amatonormativity
 Bisexual erasure
 Cisnormativity
 Complementarianism
 Compulsory heterosexuality
 Discrimination against intersex people
 Egalitarianism
 Gender studies
 Intersex and LGBT
 List of transgender-related topics
 Monique Wittig
 Non-binary discrimination
 Normality (behavior)
 Pink capitalism
 Straightwashing
 Structural functionalism
 Subject-SUBJECT consciousness
 The NeuroGenderings Network
 Transphobia

References

Bibliography
 Berlant, Lauren, and Michael Warner. (1998) “Sex in Public.” Critical Inquiry, vol. 24, no. 2, pp. 547–566. JSTOR, www.jstor.org/stable/1344178.
 
 Gray, Brandon."'Brokeback Mountain' most impressive of Tepid 2005."Box Office Mojo, LLC. 25 February 2006. 7 May 2008. .
 
 Peele, Thomas. Composition Studies, Heteronormativity, and Popular Culture. 2001 Boise State University. 5 May 2008. .
 The Pew Forum on Religion and Public Life. "U.S. Religious Landscape Survey." 7 May 2008. 7 May 2008. .

Further reading
 Judith Butler, Bodies That Matter
 Judith Butler, Gender Trouble
 Michel Foucault, History of Sexuality
 
 Michael Warner, ed. Fear of a Queer Planet. Minneapolis MN: University of Minnesota Press, 1993.
 
 
 

Feminist terminology
Social justice terminology
Neologisms
1990s neologisms